Jerzy Urban (born Jerzy Urbach, 3 August 1933 – 3 October 2022) was a Polish journalist, commentator, writer and politician, best known as the founder and editor-in-chief of the weekly magazine Nie. From 1981 to 1989 he was the Press Secretary of the Communist government under the Polish People's Republic, and the Head of the Polish Radio and Television Committee in 1989.

A staunch anticlerical and pro-communist throughout his life, he frequently was the centre of numerous controversies due to his unfiltered comments and entrenched political views resulting in support of the communist regime; on the other hand, he was a sharp-witted, intelligent and uncompromising satirist, writer and journalist, which results in a complicated legacy of his life.

Biography

Before 1989

Urban was born into an assimilated Jewish family in Łódź. His father, Jan Urbach, was an activist of Polish Socialist Party and the General Jewish Labour Bund in Poland. In 1939, they relocated to the city of Lwów (Lemberg, now Lviv). Following the outbreak of the Second World War and the German-Soviet occupation of Poland, a Soviet official mistook the last two letters of the family surname and incorrectly transcribed it as "Urban". His parents later refrained from returning to the original spelling, a move which possibly saved their lives when Germany seized Lwów in 1941.

Urban reportedly attended 17 different primary and high schools. He completed his senior high school exams as an external student. He studied in two faculties of the University of Warsaw and was expelled from both. He started his journalistic career with the journal Nowa Wieś.

From 1955 to 1957, he was a journalist - reporter and commentator - for the weekly Po prostu, which started during the rehabilitation of Władysław Gomułka, who became communist party leader. However, the newspaper was closed by the personal initiative of Gomułka, which symbolised the end of the thaw which started under Gomułka. The newspaper was closed mainly because of the biting, uncompromising opinion articles by Urban. Urban himself was officially banned from publishing under his own name. From 1961, he worked for the weekly Polityka, continuing his opinion pieces under pseudonyms. He was eventually totally forbidden from carrying out any journalistic activities. This ban continued until Gomułka lost power as party leader.

Despite his critical attitude towards Edward Gierek's rule, he was an opponent of the Solidarity movement in 1980 and often criticized its leaders (including Lech Wałęsa). From 1981 to 1989, he was the Press Secretary and spokesman for the Council of Ministers and the Communist government. He created the tradition of weekly press conferences, transmitted by Polish television and attended by both Polish and foreign journalists. In September 1984, during the month before the murder of the priest Jerzy Popiełuszko, he wrote a column "Seanse nienawiści" (hate session); he criticized the priest as an anti-communist Savonarola.

In 1986 Urban masterminded a media story that the United States had betrayed the Solidarity movement. He met with a Washington Post reporter and told him that a Polish spy for the CIA, who was later identified as Ryszard Kukliński, was aware of the plan to install martial law in 1981 and had passed that information on to the United States government. "The US administration could have publicly revealed these plans to the world and warned Solidarity," Urban said, "Had it done so, the implementation of martial law would have been impossible." At press conference Urban alleged that "Washington ... did not warn its allies. It did not boast of its agent as it customarily does." According to Urban, the Reagan administration had "lied to its own people and to its friends in Poland," when it denied having prior knowledge of martial law.

After 1989
Urban ran for office as an independent during the semi-free elections in 1989 (he was never a member of the Polish United Workers Party PZPR). He suffered a landslide defeat and since then gave up attempts to actively participate in politics.

In 1990 he established Nie, an anti-clerical tabloid-like politically-satirical newspaper, which often uses profanity. He subsequently served as its chief editor.

Court case for offence to John-Paul II
In 2002, Urban was charged with offence against the head of the Vatican state, Pope John Paul II, due to the publication in Nie of the article "Obwoźne sado-maso" (House-to-house sado-masochism); the article was published prior to a pilgrimage to Poland by the Pope. Among allegedly offensive terms used by Urban were "sędziwy bożek" (old worship idol), "gasnący starzec" ("fading old man") and "Breżniew Watykanu" (Brezhnev of the Vatican).

The Youth Forum of the political party PiS and the Media Ethics Council took him to court. In court, Magdalena Bajer, the leader of the Media Ethics Council, testified as a witness that Urban "brutally mocked the suffering of a man who was a head of state". The court case was considered a precedent. Urban pleaded not guilty. During the case he declared: "Looking at the papal cult with the eye of an atheist is just as legal as the ecstasy of devotees."

Urban was defended by the International Press Institute in Vienna, expressing its concern that the court case against Urban was a form of censorship, as well as by Reporters Without Borders, who stated: "We are perfectly aware that criticising John Paul II is an absolute taboo in Poland, but this should not prevent the authorities from defending legal principles related to freedom of the press in Europe (especially Article 10 of the European Convention on Human Rights, relating to freedom of speech)".

In turn, a specialist in church law, priest Prof. Florian Lempa stated that Urban's action did not satisfy the definition of the crime, since a head of state is only protected when he is present on Polish territory, and the article was published before the Pope arrived in Poland. Moreover, Urban "had the right to his point of view", and "satire is admissible". He added that the article was aimed at people who try to profit from the Pope, rather than at him personally.

The prosecutor asked for a sentence of ten months' imprisonment suspended over three years and a fine of 20 thousand zlotys (about €5,000). On 5 January 2005, the court convicted Urban and fined him 20,000 zlotys. The court argued, "Jerzy Urban intentionally caused a scandal by publishing an article about John Paul II at the moment when the Pope came to Poland". According to the court, the publication was a deliberate, tactical move as well as a measured provocation by Urban, since otherwise it would not have caused such a violent (popular) reaction and outrage. The court stressed that permitted criticism does not have to be pleasant, but it cannot be insulting. 

After the court verdict, Urban stated that the sentence revealed the "clericalisation of justice". He added that he did not expect much from going through the appeals process, but he would go to the European Court of Human Rights if necessary.

Death
Jerzy Urban died in Konstancin-Jeziorna on 3 October 2022 at the age of 89. He was buried at the Powązki Military Cemetery, Warsaw on 11 October 2022.

Personal life and political beliefs

Urban married three times. He had one daughter. He described himself as an atheist, and frequently criticised organised religion, especially the Roman Catholic Church in Poland. 

He was a staunch communist throughout his life; he described the Solidarność movement as the "worst thing to happen to Poland" and maintained this stance even after the fall of communism.

Legacy
He is remembered as an intelligent, skillful writer and satirist, as well as successful owner and editor-in-chief, however he remains a widely negatively received figure with a scandalous reputation.

His close friendship and support of General Jaruzelski and the decision to impose martial law in 1981, as well as his criticism, often using profanities, of Lech Wałęsa, Solidarność, John Paul II and Father Jerzy Popiełuszko – all highly revered in Poland – made him a widely disliked figure, more so after Popiełuszko's assassination. However his unremitting stances, uncompromising satire and journalistic abilities were widely acclaimed, leaving behind a complex legacy.

Awards and decorations
 Officer's Cross of the Order of Polonia Restituta

 Gold Cross of Merit

 Order of the Banner of Work, second class

 Order of Cyril and Methodius (Bulgaria)

Notes

References

External links 
 Official page of the weekly Nie
 Criminal Defamation Laws in Poland Hamper Free Expression – IFEX

1933 births
2022 deaths
21st-century memoirists
21st-century Polish Jews
Democratic Left Alliance politicians
Holocaust survivors
Jewish atheists
Jewish Polish writers
Jewish socialists
Polish atheists
Polish bloggers
Male bloggers
Polish columnists
Polish YouTubers
Polish journalists
Polish memoirists
Polish secularists
Polish television personalities
Polish United Workers' Party members
Political spokespersons
Politicians from Łódź
Press secretaries
Writers from Łódź
Officers of the Order of Polonia Restituta
Recipients of the Gold Cross of Merit (Poland)
Recipients of the Order of the Banner of Work
Critics of the Catholic Church
Burials at Powązki Military Cemetery